Rœux station (French: Gare de Rœux) is a railway station serving the commune of Rœux, Pas-de-Calais department of France. It is located on the Paris-Lille railway at kilometric point (KP) 200.760.

The station is owned and operated by SNCF and served by TER Hauts-de-France trains.

History 
In 2018 SNCF estimated that the station served 21,018 customers, down from previous years.

References 

Railway stations in Pas-de-Calais
Railway stations in France opened in 1846